Jakub Smug (23 February 1914 – 3 November 2010) was a Polish footballer who played as a defender.

Biography

Smug was born in Ustrzyki Dolne, then part of the Austrian Empire just before the outbreak of World War 1. After the war, the area where he grew up in became the Second Polish Republic. At some point he moved to Lviv to work in a factory. During his time at the factory he was approached and asked to play for Świteź Lwów, with whom in his first game, aged 17, he scored both of the goals as Świteź beat Hasmonea Lviv 2–1. In 1936 he spent time in the army, afterwards playing with Pogoń Stryj from 1937 until 1939, as well as making appearances for the Lviv national team. During World War 2, Smug spent his time in Stanisławów (now called Ivano-Frankivsk) and occasionally had to go into hiding. After the war he played with Polonia Bytom, which after a tour of Poland with the club he decided he wanted to live closer to his brother in Gdynia, so moved to Gdańsk and played with Lechia Gdańsk. He made his Lechia debut on 27 July 1947 against HCP Poznań. Most of his early Lechia appearances were in play-off games or in national cup competitions. It was not until 1949 when Smug played in the league for Lechia, playing three times in the I liga, the top league in Poland. His first I liga game was a 5–3 win against Ruch Chorzów, the club's first win in the top division. His final appearance for Lechia came on 13 November 1949 against Polonia Bytom. Lechia lost the game 8–0, which still stands as the club's record defeat.

After football Smug continued to hold close links with Lechia Gdańsk, and in May 2010 he was honoured with a star on Lechia's "Avenue of Stars", a way the club has commemorated Lechia Gdańsk legends. He died on 3 November 2010, aged 96. His funeral took place on 6 November, and he is buried in the Łostowickie Cemetery, Gdańsk.

References

1914 births
2000 deaths
Polonia Bytom players
Lechia Gdańsk players
Polish footballers
Association football defenders
People from Bieszczady County